David Michael Bell (born September 14, 1972) is an American former professional baseball third baseman, who is currently the manager for the Cincinnati Reds of Major League Baseball (MLB).  Over the course of his 12-year MLB playing career, Bell appeared at all four infield positions while playing for the Cleveland Indians, St. Louis Cardinals, Seattle Mariners, San Francisco Giants, Philadelphia Phillies, and Milwaukee Brewers. He made his MLB debut for the Indians in 1995.

After his retirement as an active player, Bell served as manager of the Triple-A Louisville Bats and (former) Double-A Carolina Mudcats, both in the Reds organization, prior to his promotion to Reds skipper, late in 2018.

The grandson of Gus Bell, son of Buddy Bell, and brother of Mike Bell, David Bell is a member of one of five families to have three generations play in the Major Leagues. In addition, David and Buddy are the fifth father-son pair to serve as major league managers, joining Connie and Earle Mack, George and Dick Sisler, Bob and Joel Skinner, and Bob and Aaron Boone.

Amateur career
Bell attended Moeller High School in Cincinnati, Ohio. Playing for the school's varsity baseball team for three years, where he ranks in the Top Ten in five career categories including doubles and plate appearances. He ranks among the top in Single Season Doubles and Most Doubles in one game. He also played Mickey Mantle and Connie Mack Baseball National Championship teams in 1988 and 1989 respectively as well as leading Moeller to a state championship in 1989. Bell was also a member of the Moeller boys' basketball team. Bell committed to play baseball at the University of Kentucky as a junior.

Professional career

Draft and minor leagues
After the Cleveland Indians selected Bell with their pick in the seventh round (190th overall), Bell decided to forgo his commitment to Kentucky.

Major League career

Cleveland Indians
Bell made his Major League debut on May 3,  as a pinch hitter for Jim Thome and stayed in the game in a defensive replacement. He was optioned to the Buffalo Bisons on May 8, 1995. He hit .272 with eight home runs and 34 RBIs in 70 games.

St. Louis Cardinals
On July 27, 1995, Bell was traded to the St. Louis Cardinals along with Pepe McNeal and Rick Heiserman for Ken Hill.

Return to Cleveland
On April 14, Bell was claimed off waivers by the Indians. On April 15, he hit the first inside-the-park home run in Jacobs Field history, and the first for the Indians since .

Seattle Mariners
On August 31, 1998, Bell was traded to the Seattle Mariners for Joey Cora. Bell was re-signed on December 19, 2001.

San Francisco Giants
On January 25, 2002, Bell was traded to the San Francisco Giants for Desi Relaford so he could have a chance to play every day. Bell scored the 2002 NLCS winning run for the San Francisco Giants from second on Kenny Lofton's single. Bell was the runner bearing down on home plate in Game 5 of the 2002 World Series when J. T. Snow lifted 3 year old batboy Darren Baker out of harm's way. Near the end of the season, he won the  Willie Mac Award for his spirit and leadership – as voted on by his teammates and coaching staff.

Philadelphia Phillies

On December 2, 2002, Bell signed a four-year $17 million deal with the Philadelphia Phillies. He made Major League history on June 28, by joining his grandfather, Gus Bell, as the first grandfather-grandson combination to hit for the cycle.

Milwaukee Brewers
Bell was traded from the Philadelphia Phillies to the Milwaukee Brewers on July 28, in a  deal that swapped him for minor league pitcher Wilfrido Laureano. The Brewers chose not to re-sign Bell after the 2006 season, and he became a free agent.

Coaching career
On October 31, the Cincinnati Reds named Bell the manager for their Double-A affiliate, the Carolina Mudcats.  Bell spent three seasons as the Mudcats manager.  In November 2011 he was named manager of the Reds' Triple-A affiliate Louisville Bats.

On October 23, the Chicago Cubs named Bell the third base coach for the Major League club.

On December 17, 2013, the St. Louis Cardinals announced hiring Bell as their new assistant hitting coach.

From 2015 through 2017, Bell served as the Cardinals' bench coach. He left the team on October 20, 2017, to become the vice president of player development for the San Francisco Giants.

Managing career

Cincinnati Reds

On October 21, 2018, the Cincinnati Reds announced Bell had been hired as the 63rd manager in franchise history. The contract spans three years with a club option for a fourth.

In an April 7, 2019 game against the Pittsburgh Pirates, Bell was ejected after his role in a bench clearing incident involving Chris Archer, Derek Dietrich, Yasiel Puig, Amir Garrett, Keone Kela, and Felipe Vázquez. This was Bell’s first career managerial ejection. Bell received a one-game suspension following the incident on April 9. On July 30, 2019, another bench-clearing mash-up occurred between the Reds and Pirates, with Bell (who had been ejected from the game in the previous half-inning) involved in it. On August 1, 2019, Bell received a 6-game suspension without eligibility to appeal.

On September 22, 2021, Bell agreed to a two-year contract extension with the Reds.

Managerial record

See also

 List of Major League Baseball players to hit for the cycle
 List of Major League Baseball players named in the Mitchell Report
 List of second-generation Major League Baseball players
 List of St. Louis Cardinals coaches
 Cleveland Indians all-time roster
 Milwaukee Brewers all-time roster
 Philadelphia Phillies all-time roster
 San Francisco Giants all-time roster
 Seattle Mariners all-time roster
 St. Louis Cardinals all-time roster
 Willie Mac Award

References

External links

David Bell at SABR (Baseball BioProject)
David Bell at Baseball Almanac

1972 births
Living people
Arkansas Travelers players
Baseball coaches from Ohio
Baseball players from Cincinnati
Buffalo Bisons (minor league) players
Burlington Indians players (1986–2006)
Canton-Akron Indians players
Charlotte Knights players
Chicago Cubs coaches
Cincinnati Reds managers
Cleveland Indians players
Columbus Indians players
Gulf Coast Indians players
Kinston Indians players
Louisville Bats managers
Louisville Redbirds players
Major League Baseball bench coaches
Major League Baseball second basemen
Major League Baseball third base coaches
Major League Baseball third basemen
Milwaukee Brewers players
Philadelphia Phillies players
St. Louis Cardinals coaches
St. Louis Cardinals players
San Francisco Giants players
Seattle Mariners players